The Greeks in Ethiopia today numbers about 500 persons and can be traced back to ancient times. It is mainly located in the capital, Addis Ababa, and the city of Dire Dawa.

History

The name Ethiopia itself is Greek and means "of burned face". It is first attested in the Homeric epics but it is unlikely to have referred to any particular nation, but rather, to people of African descent in general. The Greek community in Ethiopia is first attested by the presence of craftsmen and sailors in the 18th century (1740) in what was then Abyssinia, who played a part in the commerce between the country and Europe. The explorer James Bruce reported that a number of Greek refugees from Smyrna arrived in Gondar during the reign of the Emperor Iyasu II, who included twelve silversmiths, whom the emperor put to work producing a variety of items for both his court and the churches of Gondar.

The community saw its heyday in the early part of the 20th century with the establishment of the Holy Metropolis of Axum by the Patriarchate of Alexandria in 1908 and of the Greek organizations in Addis Ababa (1918) and Dire Dawa (1921). 

In 1969, an Association of Ethio Hellenic Studies was formed. The Founder President of the Association was Greek Metropolitan Methodios Fouyas of Aksum and the Vice presidents were Rev. Fr. Dr. V.C. Samuel, Dean of the Faculty of Theology and Dr. P. Petrides of the French Academy of Science. The Very Rev. L.S. Babte Mariam Workeneh was the Secretary General and Nicolas Geoprgkas, President of the Greek Community in Addis Ababa was the Treasurer. H.I.H. Merid Asfa Wossen CrownPrince of Ethiopia was the Patron and H.B. Archbishop Theophilos of Harar and Acting Patriarch of Ethiopia was the Chairman. To promote the scholarly works concerning Ethiopia and Greece and their historical and ecclesiastical heritage and achievements the Year Book ABBA SLAMA was published from 1970 to 1976.

Present situation

In the post-war period the community grew to 3,000 persons. It suffered during the revolution that overthrew Haile Selassie in 1974, when the hostility of the Derg towards all foreign communities drastically reduced its size to the current population of about 500.

Today there is still a Greek school located in the capital as well as a Greek Orthodox church in the same city (St. Froumendios). The school has about 120 students, many of whom receive scholarships to continue their studies in Greece. However there is an increasing initiative by Greeks to take advantage of the investment opportunities currently available in Ethiopia.

See also
 Ethiopia–Greece relations

References

Further reading 

. Reviewed in

External links
Addresses of the Greek Organizations in Ethiopia
Greeks in Eritrea

Ethiopia
Ethnic groups in Ethiopia
European diaspora in Ethiopia
Greek diaspora in Africa